The 1920 Great Britain Lions tour was the third British national rugby league team or 'Lions' tour of Australasia, where it was winter and matches were played against the Australian and New Zealand national sides, as well as several local teams. In Australia, the three-Test match series was won by the hosts. In New Zealand another three-Test series was played and won by the visitors. The tour was a success and brought in a handsome profit.

Touring squad 
At the 1919–20 Northern Rugby Football Union season's conclusion, the following Great Britain squad was assembled by the Northern Rugby Football Union to represent it on the tour of Australasia. Mr S Foster and Mr J Wilson were the team managers. Although it was a Great Britain tour, the team played as 'England' during the games.

England
 Joe Bowers, forward for Rochdale Hornets
 Joe Cartwright, hooker for Leigh
 Douglas Clark, forward for Huddersfield
 Billy Cunliffe, forward for Warrington
 Joe Doyle, three-quarter back for Barrow
 Frank Gallagher, forward for Dewsbury
 Herman Hilton, forward for Oldham
 Arthur Johnson, forward for Widnes
 Ernest Jones, half back for Rochdale Hornets
 Alf Milnes, hooker for Halifax
 Jonty Parkin, half back for Wakefield Trinity
 William Reid, forward for Widnes
 Arthur Skelhorne, forward for Warrington
 Cyril Stacey, fullback for Halifax
 Squire Stockwell, three-quarter back for Leeds
 Billy Stone, three-quarter back for Hull
 Harold Wagstaff (captain), three-quarter back for Huddersfield
 Alf Wood, fullback for Oldham

Wales
 Jim Bacon, three-quarter back for Leeds
 Evan Davies, three-quarter back for Oldham
 Ben Gronow, forward for Huddersfield
 Danny Hurcombe, three-quarter back for Wigan
 Bobby Lloyd, half back for Halifax
 George Rees, player for Leeds
 Johnny Rogers, half back for Huddersfield
 Gwyn Thomas (vice-captain), fullback for Huddersfield

Australia 
The first leg of the tour was Australia, where the game of rugby league football was in its twelfth year since splitting away from rugby union in 1908. The tour included places such as Orange, Bundaberg, Rockhampton, Toowoomba and Tamworth as well as the standard main venues of Brisbane, Newcastle, Sydney and Ipswich.

Test venues 
The three Ashes series tests took place at the following venues.

The opening match of the tour on 5 June took place between rounds 5 and 6 of the fifteen-round 1920 NSWRFL season, and saw a Metropolis (Sydney) team host the tourists at the Sydney Cricket Ground.

In front of an overflow crowd of 65,000 the visitors ran out 27-20 winners.

As the preliminary match to the New South Wales versus Britain game on 12 June, Sydney University's first intervarsity match against Queensland University under rugby league rules was played before a crowd of 60,000. Sydney won 26-14.

Albert Johnston captained New South Wales in two matches against the visiting Lions.

On Saturday, 19 June, the tourists played a match against Queensland before a crowd of around 20,000 at the Brisbane Exhibition Ground. The Queensland side featured Mick Bennett, Neville Broadfoot, Jeff Daly, Harry Fewin, Thomas Johnson, Jack Maguire, Patrick Moran, Claud O'Donnell, Walter Paten, Norm Potter, Bill Richards, Stan Ryan, E. Sabine, Colin Thompson, and J. Thompson. The British team was F G Thomas, J A Bacon, J Doyle, H Wagstaff, F Stockwell, R Lloyd, J Rogers, H Hilton, W Reid, G Rees, R Gronow, E Milnes and E Johnston. Refereed by L H Kearney, the visitors, after leading 13-10 at half-time, won the game 25-15.

First test 
The first test of the 1920 Ashes series was played on the 26th of June at the Brisbane Exhibition Ground before a crowd of 32,000. It was refereed by local whistleblower Laurie Kearney. Albert Johnston was selected to captain Australia in the opening Test of the series in the absence of champion centre Herb Gilbert. Despite a last minute reshuffling of the team which saw Johnston move to halfback.

Australia won the match 8-4.

Second test 
Albert Johnston lost the Australian captaincy on Herb Gilbert's return and played at five-eighth in the second Ashes Test. The match was played on the 3rd of July at the Sydney Cricket Ground and attracted 67,739 spectators, then a record attendance for any sport at the SCG.

Australian halfback Duncan Thompson starred in the match, which was won by the hosts 21-8. With this Australia secured the Ashes for the first time on home soil.

Third test 
The third Test was played on the 10th of July in Sydney, with Great Britain winning 23-13.

The British also played two matches against a Newcastle rugby league team that featured Dan "Laddo" Davies. The first game was on the 25th of August and the tourists won 17-10. The second was on the 28th which they also won 24-3.

New Zealand 

The British team played a three-Test series against New Zealand just as it did against Australia. Karl Ifwerson captained the Kiwis against the tourists.

After losing their first game to Auckland, the tourists won all three Tests.

In the Test at Wellington, the British were behind on the scoreboard 10-0, but made it 10-6 before Douglas Clark forced his way over the line for the match-winning try which Ben Gronow converted, giving the visitors an 11-10 victory.

The second Test was played in Christchurch on Saturday, 7 August, and was won by the tourists 19 points to 3.

Tuesday 3rd August the touring England side played a mid week match against a King Country XIII in Taumarunui in front of a 4000 strong Crowd at Taumarunui Domain. England won easily 47-3. Wagstaffe scored twice in the first half for the visitors along with one a piece for Stockwell and Milne. Doran got one back for King Country. Half time score 16-3. In the 2nd spell, Stockwell scored 2 tries and Wagstaffe, Bowers, Doyle and Johnston one each. final score 47-3.

References 

Great Britain national rugby league team tours
Great Britain Lions tour of Australia and New Zealand
Great Britain Lions tour of Australia and New Zealand
Great Britain Lions tour of Australia and New Zealand
Rugby league tours of Australia
Rugby league tours of New Zealand